Dopamine is a 2003 romantic comedy-drama film written and directed by Mark Decena.

Plot
Rand is a computer animator, who has created an artificial intelligence creature designed to interact with children and teach them responsibility. When his prototype is forced into practice at a school, Rand encounters Sarah, a teacher he was inexplicably drawn to, at his favorite bar one fateful evening. Sparks fly between them, but fundamental differences in their approaches to love and relationships slow them down to a halt.

Cast
 John Livingston as Rand
 Sabrina Lloyd as Sarah
 Bruno Campos as Winston
 Rueben Grundy as Johnson
 Kathleen Antonia as Tammy
 Nicole Wilder as Machiko
 William Windom as Rand's father
 Dennis Yen as Toru
 Natalie Decena in the womb

Reception

Critical response
On Rotten Tomatoes it has a 52% rating based on 52 reviews. On Metacritic it has a score of 52 out of 100 based on 23 reviews, indicating "mixed or average reviews".

Awards
 Won the Alfred P. Sloan Prize at the 2003 Sundance Film Festival
 Nomination for Grand Jury Prize at the 2003 Sundance Film Festival.

References

External links
 
 
 

2003 films
2003 independent films
2003 romantic comedy-drama films
American romantic comedy-drama films
Alfred P. Sloan Prize winners
Films about artificial intelligence
Films set in San Francisco
Films set in the San Francisco Bay Area
Films shot in San Francisco
American independent films
Sundance Film Festival award winners
2003 comedy films
2003 drama films
2000s English-language films
2000s American films